Allegro Brillant, Op. 92, is a composition written for Piano four hands by Felix Mendelssohn consisting of a theme in A major, written in 1841 and dedicated to Clara Schumann.

References

External links
 
 
 "Allegro Brillant, Op. 92", Boosey & Hawkes

Compositions by Felix Mendelssohn
Compositions for piano four-hands
Variations
1841 compositions
Compositions in A major
Music dedicated to family or friends